Colchicum alpinum, the  alpine autumn crocus, is a corm-forming perennial with pale, delicate rosy-purple flowers, similar to C. autumnale but smaller.  It is native to the Alps and the Appennini of Italy, Switzerland, France and Sicily, and cultivated as an ornamental in other regions.

References

alpinum
Flora of Italy
Flora of France
Flora of Switzerland
Flora of Sicily
Garden plants
Plants described in 1805